Charles Cathcart may refer to:

 Charles Cathcart, 8th Lord Cathcart (1686–1740), British Army officer
 Charles Cathcart, 9th Lord Cathcart (1721–1776), British soldier and diplomat
 Charles Cathcart, 2nd Earl Cathcart (1783–1859), British Army general and Governor General of the Province of Canada
 Charles Cathcart, 7th Earl Cathcart (born 1952), British peer and member of the House of Lords
 Charles Allan Cathcart (1759–1788), British soldier and MP, son of the 9th Lord Cathcart
 Charles W. Cathcart (1809–1888), United States Representative and Senator from Indiana
 Charles Walker Cathcart (1853–1932), Scottish surgeon and rugby union player